Hibernia is a rural locality in the Central Highlands Region, Queensland, Australia.

Geography 
The Central Western railway line forms the north-eastern boundary of the locality entering from the east (Capella) and exiting to the north-west  (Cheeseborough).

The Gregory Highway enters the locality from the east (Capella) and exits to the north-west (Cheeseborough).

Despite its name, Capella airport  is at Airport Road in Hibernia but on the boundary with neighbouring Capella. It has a  gravel airstrip. It has no lighting so it is only suitable for daytime use. It is operated by the Central Highlands Regional Council.

References 

Central Highlands Region
Localities in Queensland